Chilbosan is a mountain in North Hamgyong province (Hamgyŏng-bukto ), North Korea. The name translates as seven treasures, stemming from the legend that Chilbo-san has seven treasures buried in it. Chilbo-san is particularly noted for its views when covered in snow. The mountain is commonly divided into Inner Chilbo, Outer Chilbo, and Sea Chilbo. Amongst the main attractions apart from the views is the Kaesim Temple, dating from the 9th century.

Environment
Major part of the mountain is covered by mixed broadleaf and coniferous forest and protected in a 30,000 ha national park. It has been identified by BirdLife International as an Important Bird Area (IBA) because it supports populations of Oriental storks and critically endangered Baer's pochards.

References

External links

The Scenery of Mt. Chilbo at Naenara
A slide show about Chilbosan (in German)

Mountains of North Korea
Important Bird Areas of North Korea